Margin  may refer to:

Physical or graphical edges
Margin (typography), the white space that surrounds the content of a page
Continental margin, the zone of the ocean floor that separates the thin oceanic crust from thick continental crust
Leaf margin, the edge of a leaf
Resection margin, the tissue near a tumor that is removed to ensure that no cancer cells are left behind

Economics and finance
Margin of profit, the fraction of revenue that is left after paying expenses
Margin (economics), a set of constraints conceptualised as a border
Margin (finance), a type of financial collateral used to cover credit risk
Margin (journal), an economics journal
Contribution margin
Gross margin

Figurative edges
Margin (machine learning), the distance between a decision boundary and a data  point
Marginal frequency distribution, in statistics (Frequency distribution § Joint frequency distributions)

Other uses
Margins (film), a 2022 Italian film by Niccolò Falsetti
The Margin (album), a 1985 album by Peter Hammill
The Margin (film), a 1976 French film by Walerian Borowczyk
The Margin (novel), a 1967 novel by André Pieyre de Mandiargues; basis for the film
Margasin, or Margin, a village in Qazvin Province, Iran
USS Margin (SP-2119), also ID-2119, a US Navy patrol boat 1918–1919

See also
Margin Call, a 2011 film
Margin of safety (disambiguation)
margin of victory at Wiktionary
Marginal (disambiguation)